The 2013–14 Turkish Basketball League, officially named the Beko Basketball League for sponsorship reasons, was the 48th season of the top professional basketball league in Turkey.

Fenerbahçe Ülker took the title, winning their 6th title. Galatasaray Liv Hospital were runners-up.

Clubs and arenas

Regular season

League table

Results
{| style="font-size: 85%; text-align: center" class="wikitable"
|-
|
| align="center" width=50|APE
| width=50|AEF
| width=50|TED
| width=50|BAN
| width=50|BJK
| width=50|FBÜ
| width=50|GSL
| width=50|MBB
| width=50|OLE
| width=50|KSK
| width=50|RHG
| width=50|SEÜ
| width=50|TOF
| width=50|TTS
| width=50|TSB
| width=50|UŞK
|-
|align=left|Aliağa Petkim
| style="background:#ccc;"|
| style="background:#fcc;"| 71–85
| style="background:#fcc;"| 76–78
| style="background:#fcc;"| 64–76
| style="background:#fcc;"| 50–91
| style="background:#fcc;"| 65–81
| style="background:#cfc;"| 77–69 
| style="background:#fcc;"| 74–82
| style="background:#cfc;"| 102–91
| style="background:#fcc;"| 75–94
| style="background:#fcc;"| 61–95
| style="background:#cfc;"| 82–73
| style="background:#fcc;"| 73–91
| style="background:#fcc;"| 65–75
| style="background:#fcc;"| 84–92
| style="background:#fcc;"| 68–70 
|-
|align=left|Anadolu Efes
| style="background:#cfc;"| 77–57
| style="background:#ccc;"| 
| style="background:#cfc;"| 93–75
| style="background:#fcc;"| 70–76
| style="background:#cfc;"| 64–57
| style="background:#fcc;"| 64–73
| style="background:#fcc;"| 67–85
| style="background:#cfc;"| 77–71
| style="background:#cfc;"| 95–79 
| style="background:#cfc;"| 73–68
| style="background:#cfc;"| 71–62
| style="background:#cfc;"| 79–72
| style="background:#cfc;"| 74–67
| style="background:#cfc;"| 82–77
| style="background:#cfc;"| 91–79
| style="background:#cfc;"| 79–71 
|-
|align=left|Aykon TED Kolejliler
| style="background:#cfc;"| 72–69
| style="background:#fcc;"| 62–74
| style="background:#ccc;"| 
| style="background:#fcc;"| 79–99
| style="background:#fcc;"| 68–75
| style="background:#fcc;"| 64–81
| style="background:#fcc;"| 78–83
| style="background:#cfc;"| 85–70
| style="background:#cfc;"| 82–74
| style="background:#cfc;"| 99–64
| style="background:#fcc;"| 70–75
| style="background:#cfc;"| 89–87 
| style="background:#fcc;"| 88–93
| style="background:#cfc;"| 79–69
| style="background:#cfc;"| 91–80
| style="background:#fcc;"| 68–74
|-
|align=left|Banvit
| style="background:#cfc;"| 94–52
| style="background:#cfc;"| 73–72
| style="background:#cfc;"| 95–71
| style="background:#ccc;"| 
| style="background:#cfc;"| 80–72
| style="background:#cfc;"| 91–76
| style="background:#cfc;"| 83–72
| style="background:#cfc;"| 94–63
| style="background:#cfc;"| 101–58
| style="background:#cfc;"| 85–74
| style="background:#cfc;"| 87–82 
| style="background:#cfc;"| 100–78 
| style="background:#cfc;"| 86–70
| style="background:#cfc;"| 70–59
| style="background:#cfc;"| 94–78
| style="background:#cfc;"| 68–61
|-
|align=left|Beşiktaş İntegral Forex 
| style="background:#cfc;"| 91–53
| style="background:#cfc;"| 71–57
| style="background:#fcc;"| 74–78
| style="background:#cfc;"| 73–60
| style="background:#ccc;"| 
| style="background:#fcc;"| 69–77
| style="background:#cfc;"| 82–78
| style="background:#cfc;"| 85–78
| style="background:#cfc;"| 87–68
| style="background:#cfc;"| 69–68
| style="background:#cfc;"| 94–91
| style="background:#cfc;"| 81–67
| style="background:#fcc;"| 79–85
| style="background:#fcc;"| 67–71
| style="background:#cfc;"| 87–69
| style="background:#cfc;"| 85–80
|-
|align=left|Fenerbahçe Ülker
| style="background:#cfc;"| 89–56
| style="background:#cfc;"| 84–65
| style="background:#cfc;"| 85–79
| style="background:#fcc;"| 78–79
| style="background:#cfc;"| 90–76
| style="background:#ccc;"| 
| style="background:#cfc;"| 77–52
| style="background:#cfc;"| 87–63
| style="background:#cfc;"| 101–69
| style="background:#fcc;"| 66–76 
| style="background:#cfc;"| 81–66
| style="background:#cfc;"| 97–80
| style="background:#cfc;"| 70–59
| style="background:#cfc;"| 84–63
| style="background:#cfc;"| 84–62
| style="background:#cfc;"| 97–67 
|-
|align=left|Galatasaray Liv Hospital
| style="background:#cfc;"| 94–80
| style="background:#fcc;"| 67–78
| style="background:#cfc;"| 85–73
| style="background:#fcc;"| 68–79
| style="background:#cfc;"| 87–82
| style="background:#cfc;"| 72–62
| style="background:#ccc;"| 
| style="background:#cfc;"| 85–60
| style="background:#cfc;"| 93–78
| style="background:#fcc;"| 70–72
| style="background:#cfc;"| 79–69
| style="background:#cfc;"| 79–56
| style="background:#cfc;"| 87–80
| style="background:#cfc;"| 89–65
| style="background:#cfc;"| 87–81
| style="background:#cfc;"| 73–70
|-
|align=left|Mersin BB
| style="background:#cfc;"| 84–79
| style="background:#fcc;"| 76–81
| style="background:#fcc;"| 80–84
| style="background:#fcc;"| 75–77
| style="background:#fcc;"| 77–87
| style="background:#fcc;"| 75–100
| style="background:#fcc;"| 88–100
| style="background:#ccc;"| 
| style="background:#fcc;"| 77–78
| style="background:#cfc;"| 74–72
| style="background:#fcc;"| 58–88
| style="background:#cfc;"| 76–72
| style="background:#fcc;"| 83–89
| style="background:#cfc;"| 88–72 
| style="background:#cfc;"| 97–87
| style="background:#fcc;"| 73–78
|-
|align=left|Olin Edirne
| style="background:#cfc;"| 98–79
| style="background:#fcc;"| 65–99
| style="background:#fcc;"| 68–92
| style="background:#fcc;"| 64–89
| style="background:#fcc;"| 79–86 
| style="background:#fcc;"| 82–111
| style="background:#fcc;"| 77–98
| style="background:#cfc;"| 88–86 
| style="background:#ccc;"| 
| style="background:#fcc;"| 73–96
| style="background:#fcc;"| 78–95
| style="background:#fcc;"| 87–93
| style="background:#cfc;"| 82–78
| style="background:#fcc;"| 65–101
| style="background:#fcc;"| 73–96
| style="background:#fcc;"| 77–85
|-
|align=left|Pınar Karşıyaka
| style="background:#cfc;"| 89–65
| style="background:#fcc;"| 76–80
| style="background:#cfc;"| 76–53
| style="background:#cfc;"| 81–75
| style="background:#cfc;"| 84–77
| style="background:#cfc;"| 83–74
| style="background:#fcc;"| 58–71
| style="background:#cfc;"| 96–63
| style="background:#cfc;"| 93–85
| style="background:#ccc;"| 
| style="background:#cfc;"| 70–64
| style="background:#cfc;"| 91–88
| style="background:#cfc;"| 86–67 
| style="background:#cfc;"| 90–80
| style="background:#fcc;"| 64–72
| style="background:#cfc;"| 93–72
|-
|align=left|Royal Halı Gaziantep
| style="background:#cfc;"| 72–64
| style="background:#fcc;"| 59–67
| style="background:#fcc;"| 65–82 
| style="background:#fcc;"| 58–60
| style="background:#fcc;"| 68–73
| style="background:#fcc;"| 76–78
| style="background:#cfc;"| 69–65
| style="background:#cfc;"| 68–59
| style="background:#fcc;"| 83–88 
| style="background:#cfc;"| 95–92
| style="background:#ccc;"| 
| style="background:#fcc;"| 73–74
| style="background:#cfc;"| 85–68
| style="background:#cfc;"| 80–66
| style="background:#fcc;"| 68–73
| style="background:#cfc;"| 92–71
|-
|align=left|Selçuk Üniversitesi
| style="background:#cfc;"| 83–76
| style="background:#cfc;"| 76–72
| style="background:#cfc;"| 98–75
| style="background:#fcc;"| 70–79
| style="background:#fcc;"| 58–61
| style="background:#fcc;"| 55–80
| style="background:#fcc;"| 69–91 
| style="background:#cfc;"| 83–79
| style="background:#fcc;"| 76–88
| style="background:#fcc;"| 84–98
| style="background:#cfc;"| 89–77 
| style="background:#ccc;"| 
| style="background:#cfc;"| 70–67
| style="background:#cfc;"| 89–83
| style="background:#cfc;"| 84–77
| style="background:#fcc;"| 61–98 
|-
|align=left|Tofaş
| style="background:#cfc;"| 117–82
| style="background:#fcc;"| 78–84
| style="background:#cfc;"| 89–84
| style="background:#fcc;"| 60–84
| style="background:#cfc;"| 76–74 
| style="background:#cfc;"| 89–81
| style="background:#cfc;"| 67–60
| style="background:#fcc;"| 72–79
| style="background:#cfc;"| 126–67
| style="background:#cfc;"| 71–69
| style="background:#cfc;"| 93–76
| style="background:#cfc;"| 89–87 
| style="background:#ccc;"|
| style="background:#cfc;"| 83–80
| style="background:#cfc;"| 83–80 
| style="background:#fcc;"| 81–87
|-
|align=left|Türk Telekom
| style="background:#cfc;"| 96–80
| style="background:#fcc;"| 69–75
| style="background:#cfc;"| 84–66
| style="background:#fcc;"| 73–81
| style="background:#fcc;"| 67–84
| style="background:#fcc;"| 63–69
| style="background:#cfc;"| 70–64
| style="background:#cfc;"| 79–74
| style="background:#fcc;"| 72–80
| style="background:#cfc;"| 96–74
| style="background:#cfc;"| 85–83
| style="background:#fcc;"| 67–53
| style="background:#fcc;"| 79–83
| style="background:#ccc;"|
| style="background:#fcc;"| 72–82
| style="background:#fcc;"| 64–76
|-
|align=left|Trabzonspor Medical Park
| style="background:#cfc;"| 96–64
| style="background:#fcc;"| 63–83
| style="background:#cfc;"| 78–65
| style="background:#fcc;"| 85–86
| style="background:#fcc;"| 79–87
| style="background:#fcc;"| 68–76 
| style="background:#fcc;"| 69–75
| style="background:#cfc;"| 98–73
| style="background:#fcc;"| 88–93
| style="background:#cfc;"| 84–73
| style="background:#fcc;"| 56–60
| style="background:#cfc;"| 99–73
| style="background:#cfc;"| 95–81
| style="background:#fcc;"| 71–73 
| style="background:#ccc;"|
| style="background:#cfc;"| 100–83
|-
|align=left|Uşak Sportif
| style="background:#cfc;"| 89–64
| style="background:#cfc;"| 73–68
| style="background:#cfc;"| 79–65
| style="background:#fcc;"| 64–71
| style="background:#cfc;"| 85–83
| style="background:#fcc;"| 68–87
| style="background:#fcc;"| 79–94
| style="background:#cfc;"| 81–71
| style="background:#cfc;"| 108–98
| style="background:#cfc;"| 82–77
| style="background:#fcc;"| 64–74
| style="background:#cfc;"| 91–78
| style="background:#cfc;"| 75–71
| style="background:#fcc;"| 66–77
| style="background:#fcc;"| 65–78
| style="background:#ccc;"|
|-

Playoffs

Individual statistics

Points

Rebounds

Assists

Blocks

Steals

External links
Official Site
TBLStat.net History Page

References

Turkish Basketball Super League seasons
Turkish
1